Kaan Dalay (born July 26, 1981) is a Turkish wheelchair basketball player and Paralympian. He competes in the Turkish Wheelchair Basketball Super League for Beşiktaş RMK wheelchair basketball team, and is part of Turkey men's national wheelchair basketball team.

He played at the 2012 Summer Paralympics in London, United Kingdom and 2016 Summer Paralympics in Rio de Janeiro, Brazil.

References

Living people
1981 births
Turkish men's wheelchair basketball players
Beşiktaş JK wheelchair basketball players
Paralympic wheelchair basketball players of Turkey
Wheelchair basketball players at the 2012 Summer Paralympics
Wheelchair basketball players at the 2016 Summer Paralympics